Faneva Imà Andriatsima (born 3 June 1984) is a Malagasy professional footballer who plays as a forward.

Career
Born in the Malagasy capital, Antananarivo, Andriatsima began his career at homeland club AS St-Michel. In 2004, he joined USCA Foot and scored 45 goals in 60 appearances for his new side.

In 2007, he made the switch to French Ligue 2, where he joined FC Nantes.

On 7 January 2008, he joined Championnat National side AS Cannes on loan, for the remainder of the season, playing 16 games and scoring 4 goals.

In June 2008, Andriatsima joined side US Boulogne in the French second tier, again on loan, for the 2008–09 season. He was given the number nine shirt. On 11 July 2009, he left Nantes and signed for Amiens SC.

In 2016, he moved to Sochaux.

International
Andriatsima played internationally for Madagascar, and was his side's top scorer in 2010 FIFA World Cup qualification. In 2019, Andriatsima confirmed he would retire from international football. He played at 2019 Africa Cup of Nations when Madagascar made a sensational advance to the quarterfinals.

Career statistics

Club

International

International goals
Scores and results list Madagascar's goal tally first.

Honours

Club
USCA Foot
 THB Champions League (1) : Champion : 2005
 Coupe de Madagascar (1) : 2005

Créteil
 Championnat National (1) : 2013

Individual

National Team
Nominees shortlist for African Player of the year : 2018
Top scorer Africa Cup of Nations qualification Group A : 2019
Knight Order of Madagascar: 2019

Record

First malagasy player nominated for the African Player of the year trophy : 2018

References

External links
 
 
 

Living people
1984 births
People from Antananarivo
Association football forwards
Malagasy footballers
USCA Foot players
FC Nantes players
AS Cannes players
US Boulogne players
Amiens SC players
AS Beauvais Oise players
US Créteil-Lusitanos players
FC Sochaux-Montbéliard players
Le Havre AC players
Clermont Foot players
Abha Club players
Al-Fayha FC players
Al Hamriyah Club players
Ligue 2 players
Championnat National players
Saudi Professional League players
UAE First Division League players
Madagascar international footballers
Malagasy expatriates in France
2019 Africa Cup of Nations players
Expatriate footballers in France
Expatriate footballers in Saudi Arabia
Expatriate footballers in the United Arab Emirates
Recipients of orders, decorations, and medals of Madagascar